Hypodontium is a genus of haplolepideous mosses (Dicranidae) in the monotypic family Hypodontiaceae.

References

Moss genera
Dicranales